José Luis Dalmao (born 14 July 1969) is a Uruguayan former professional footballer who played as a forward.

References

1969 births
Living people
Uruguayan footballers
Association football forwards
Defensor Sporting players
ES La Rochelle players
FC Nantes players
USL Dunkerque players
Pau FC players
Nîmes Olympique players
FC Sète 34 players
Montauban FCTG players
Ligue 1 players
Ligue 2 players
Uruguayan expatriate footballers
Expatriate footballers in France
Uruguayan expatriate sportspeople in France